Kushmandi Assembly constituency is an assembly constituency in Dakshin Dinajpur district in the Indian state of West Bengal. It is reserved for scheduled castes.

Overview
As per orders of the Delimitation Commission, No. 37 Kushmandi Assembly constituency (SC) covers Kushmandi community development block and Belbari II, Jahangirpur and Sukdebpur gram panchayats of Gangarampur community development block.

Kushmandi Assembly constituency is part of No. 6 Balurghat (Lok Sabha constituency).

Members of Legislative Assembly

Election results

2021
In the 2021 election, Rekha Roy of Trinamool Congress defeated her nearest rival, Ranjit Kumar Roy of BJP.

2016
In the 2016 election, Narmada Chandra Roy of RSP defeated Rekha Roy of Trinamool Congress.

.# Swing calculated on LF+Congress vote percentages taken together in 2016.

2011
In the 2011 election, Narmada Chandra Roy of RSP defeated Partha Sarathi Sarkar of Congress.

.# Swing calculated on Congress+Trinamool Congress vote percentages taken together in 2006.

1977–2006
In the 2006, 2001, 1996, 1991 and 1987 state assembly elections Narmada Chandra Roy of RSP won the 37 Kushmandi (SC) assembly seat defeating his nearest rivals, Rajib Lochan Sarkar of Congress, Jitendra Nath Sarkar of Trinamool Congress, Krishna Chandra Sarkar of Congress, Jitendra Nath Sarkar of Congress and Dhirendra Nath Sarkar of Congress respectively. Contests in most years were multi cornered but only winners and runners are being mentioned. Dhirendra Nath Sarkar of Congress defeated Narmada Chandra Roy of RSP in 1982 and Jogendra Nath Roy of RSP in 1977.

1962–1972
Jatindra Mohan Roy of Congress won in 1972, 1971, 1969 and 1967. Khalil Sayed of CPI won in 1962. The seat did not exist prior to that.

References

Assembly constituencies of West Bengal
Politics of Dakshin Dinajpur district